Hohenwald is a city in and the county seat of Lewis County, Tennessee. The population was 3,757 at the 2010 census. The name "Hohenwald" is a German word that means "High Forest".

Meriwether Lewis, of the Lewis and Clark Expedition, died and was buried seven miles east of the town at Grinder's Stand in 1809. Rod Brasfield, an old Grand Ole Opry comedy star, made his home in Hohenwald and referred to it in his routines. David Sisco, who in 1974 placed ninth in points in the Winston Cup Series, is a native of Hohenwald, as was author William Gay, whose books include The Long Home, Provinces of Night, I Hate to See That Evening Sun Go Down, and Twilight.

The third largest animal trophy mount collection in North America is located at the Lewis County Museum of Local and Natural History in downtown Hohenwald. Hohenwald is also the home of the Elephant Sanctuary, the largest natural-habitat sanctuary for elephants in the United States. Hohenwald is one of only a few Mid-American towns that have met the Transition Towns criteria.  The Buffalo Valley addiction extended care community is located there providing treatment and long-term housing for recovering persons. The Lewis County Courthouse and Hohenwald Rail Depot are listed on the National Register of Historic Places.

History
The town was founded in 1878 and later merged with a town named "New Switzerland" to the south. New Switzerland was founded in 1894 by Swiss immigrants in conjunction with the Nashville, Chattanooga and St. Louis Railway.

On September 29, 1916 a mob took two men from the Hohenwald jail and shot them to death against trees on a nearby hill.

Geography
Hohenwald is located at  (35.5479, -87.5520).

Demographics

2020 census

As of the 2020 United States census, there were 3,668 people, 1,555 households, and 840 families residing in the city.

2000 census
As of the census of 2000, there were 3,754 people, 1,534 households, and 989 families residing in the city. The population density was 861.4 people per square mile (332.4/km2). There were 1,708 housing units at an average density of 391.9 per square mile (151.3/km2). The racial makeup of the city was 96.59% White, 2.08% Black, 0.11% Native American, 0.16% Asian, 0.32% from other races, and 0.75% from two or more races. Hispanic or Latino people of any race were 1.12% of the population.

There were 1,534 households, out of which 28.4% had children under the age of 18 living with them, 48.2% were married couples living together, 13.1% had a female householder with no husband present, and 35.5% were non-families. 32.6% of all households were made up of individuals, and 17.3% had someone living alone who was 65 years of age or older. The average household size was 2.30 and the average family size was 2.89.

In the city, the population was spread out, with 24.6% under the age of 18, 7.7% from 18 to 24, 24.6% from 25 to 44, 22.8% from 45 to 64, and 20.3% who were 65 years of age or older. The median age was 39 years. For every 100 females there were 86.9 males. For every 100 females age 18 and over, there were 80.2 males.

The median income for a household in the city was $24,676, and the median income for a family was $37,609. Males had a median income of $25,863 versus $23,056 for females. The per capita income for the city was $16,665. About 11.1% of families and 17.6% of the population were below the poverty line, including 18.0% of those under age 18 and 17.3% of those age 65 or over.

References

External links
 
 The Elephant Sanctuary in Tennessee
 Welcome to Buffalo Valley
 Meriwether Lewis Park
 Hohenwald Chamber of Commerce

Cities in Tennessee
Cities in Lewis County, Tennessee
County seats in Tennessee
Swiss-American history
Populated places established in 1878
1878 establishments in Tennessee